Charlotte Shakespeare was a professional, non-profit theatre company in Charlotte, North Carolina.  The company specialized in intimate and accessible performances of traditional and modern classics, with an emphasis on the plays of William Shakespeare and with a mission of presenting plays "that reflect timeless truths about the human condition and honor Shakespeare’s genius for storytelling and language".

History
The company was founded by Elise Wilkinson and Joe Copley in 2006 under the name Collaborative Arts Theatre.  It was granted status as a 501(c)(3) non-profit organization in 2008. The name was changed to Charlotte Shakespeare in 2012.  Charlotte Shakespeare has never had a performance venue of its own.  In its first two years productions took place in a tavern, in a series of apartments, and on the Green.  Since that time all plays have been produced in theaters at Spirit Square or on The Green. The company went on hiatus in the summer of 2015 and has not reopened.

Production history
2012 Season
 The Merchant of Venice by William Shakespeare  August  McGlohon Theatre at Spirit Square
 The Tempest by William Shakespeare  June  outdoors at The Green
 Bad Dates by Theresa Rebeck  March  Duke Energy Theatre at Spirit Square

2011 Season
 Time Stands Still by Donald Margulies  November  Duke Energy Theatre at Spirit Square
 King Lear by William Shakespeare  August  McGlohon Theatre at Spirit Square
 Tartuffe by Moliere  June  outdoors at The Green
 Women of Will  Shakespeare’s heroines  March  Duke Energy Theatre at Spirit Square

2010 Season
 Incorruptible by Michael Hollinger  November  Duke Energy Theatre at Spirit Square
 Othello by William Shakespeare  August  McGlohon Theatre at Spirit Square
 The Comedy of Errors by William Shakespeare  June  outdoors at The Green

2009 Season
 Julius Caesar by William Shakespeare  August   McGlohon Theatre at Spirit Square
 Twelfth Night by William Shakespeare  May–June  outdoors at The Green

2008 Season
 Sitcoms Live!  Classic television sitcom episodes performed live  September  Duke Energy Theatre at Spirit Square
 Much Ado About Nothing by William Shakespeare  August  McGlohon Theatre at Spirit Square
 Romeo and Juliet by William Shakespeare  June  outdoors at The Green
 Closer Than Ever by Richard Maltby and David Shire  March  Duke Power Theatre at Spirit Square

2007 Season
 The Sublet Experiment by Ethan Youngerman  October  various venues
 As You Like It by William Shakespeare  June  outdoors at The Green
 Fiction by Steven Dietz  March  Duke Power Theatre at Spirit Square

2006 Season
 Bad Dates by Theresa Rebeck  September  A luxury apartment at 1315 East Condominiums
 A Midsummer Night's Dream by William Shakespeare  May  outdoors at The Green
 Tavern Shakespeare by Jocelyn Rose and Elise Wilkinson  March  Ri-Ra Irish Pub, near 208 N Tryon St

Charlotte Shakespeare Festival
Each summer Charlotte Shakespeare produced the Charlotte Shakespeare Festival which began in June with a show presented outdoors on The Green, an uptown pocket park.   Charlotte Magazine described the annual return of Shakespeare on the Green as, "one of the best cultural gifts Charlotte will get all year". Admission was free and the company depended on voluntary donations.  A second show was presented in August at Spirit Square.  Most productions were from the Shakespeare canon, but an exception was made in 2011 when the outdoor summer play was Tartuffe by Moliere.

Awards & reviews

Metrolina Theatre Association awards
The Metrolina Theatre Association (MTA) is a Charlotte organization which gives awards each year to support and advocate for local theatre, and these awards are a major source of public recognition for theatres, shows, and individuals. A selected list of MTA awards won by Collaborative Arts is shown below.
 2011 Outstanding Supporting Actor - Female - comedy:  Meghan Lowther (Dorine) - Tartuffe   
 2011 Outstanding Costume Design - drama:  Suzy Hartness - King Lear
 2010 Outstanding Production - comedy:  Incorruptible
 2010 Outstanding Direction - comedy:  Peter Smeal - Incorruptible
 2010 Outstanding Supporting Actor - Male - comedy:  Joe Copley (Brother Martin) - Incorruptible 
 2010 Outstanding Costume Design - comedy:  Erin Dougherty - The Comedy of Errors
 2010 Outstanding Cameo: Alan England (Duke/Musician) - Othello
 2008 Other Exemplary Performance/Element - comedy:  Sitcoms Live!
 2008 Outstanding Set Design - comedy:  Chris Timmons - Much Ado About Nothing

Creative Loafing's Annual Charlotte Theatre Awards
Creative Loafing (CL) is a publisher of newsweeklies and their associated websites focusing on local affairs, including arts and entertainment.  A selected list of CL awards won by Collaborative Arts is shown below.
 2011 Best Supporting Actress - drama:  Christine Dougan (Emilia) - Othello
 2011 Top 20 Shows:  Othello
 2011 Top 20 Shows:  Incorruptible 
 2010 Outstanding Costume Design - comedy:  Erin Dougherty - The Comedy of Errors
 2010 Outstanding Cameo - drama:  Alan England (Duke/Musician) - Othello
 2007 Best Performing Arts Overachiever:  Elise Wilkinson
 2007 Best Supporting Actress - drama:  Elise Wilkinson (Abby) - Fiction
 2007 Sweet 16 Award:  The Sublet Experiment
 2007 Sweet 16 Award:  Fiction
 2006 Theater Event of the Year:  Shakespeare on the Green
 2006 Sweet 16 Award:  Bad Dates
 2006 Sweet 16 Award:  A Midsummer Night's Dream

Selected Reviews

 Tavern Shakespeare
 Tavern Shakespeare
 A Midsummer Night's Dream
 A Midsummer Night's Dream
 Bad Dates
 Bad Dates
 Fiction
 Fiction
 As You Like It
 As You Like It
 The Sublet Experiment
 The Sublet Experiment
 Closer Than Ever
 Romeo and Juliet
 Romeo and Juliet
 Much Ado About Nothing
 Much Ado About Nothing
 Sitcoms Live!
 Sitcoms Live!
 Twelfth Night
 Julius Caesar
 Julius Caesar	
 The Comedy of Errors
 The Comedy of Errors
 Othello
 Incorruptible
 Incorruptible
 Women of Will
 Women of Will
 Tartuffe
 King Lear
 King Lear
 Time Stands Still
 Bad Dates
 The Tempest
 The Merchant of Venice 
 The Merchant of Venice
 Opus

References

External links
 Charlotte Shakespeare Festival on the Green in Uptown A Retrospective Photo Essay

Former theatres in the United States
Theatre companies in Charlotte, North Carolina
Culture of Charlotte, North Carolina
Shakespearean theatre companies
Regional theatre in the United States
Arts organizations established in 2006